David Prince (born 10 September 1983) is an American sprint runner who runs in the T44 class. He was raised by missionary parents and traveled frequently, living for a while in Oaxaca, Mexico. He lost his right leg below the knee in a motorcycle accident in 2002.

Athletics career
In 2010, Prince won a gold medal at the U.S. Paralympic National Championship in the 400m event, a silver medal in the long jump and a bronze medal in the 200m event. In 2011, Prince won a gold medal at the 2011 Parapan American Games in the 200m and 400m events. In 2011 at the IPC World Championship, he won a silver medal in the 4 × 100 m relay and a bronze medal in the 400m event. In 2011 U.S. at the Paralympic National Championship, he won a gold medal in the 200m and 400m events and a silver medal in the 100m race.

Prince narrowly missed qualifying for the 2008 Paralympic Games in Beijing, China. In the 2012 Paralympic Games, Prince won an individual bronze medal in the 400 meter T43/44 event, in a new world record time for his own T44 classification.

References

See also
The Mechanics of Running Blades

1983 births
Living people
Paralympic track and field athletes of the United States
Athletes (track and field) at the 2012 Summer Paralympics
Paralympic bronze medalists for the United States
American male sprinters
World record holders in Paralympic athletics
Medalists at the 2012 Summer Paralympics
Paralympic medalists in athletics (track and field)
Medalists at the 2011 Parapan American Games
Medalists at the World Para Athletics Championships
People from Venice, Florida
Sportspeople from Marietta, Georgia
Track and field athletes from Georgia (U.S. state)
Track and field athletes from Florida
Doping cases in athletics
American sportspeople in doping cases
Doping cases in paralympic sports